Juha Salonen (born 16 October 1961) is a Finnish judoka. He competed at the 1984, 1988 and the 1992 Summer Olympics.

References

External links
 

1961 births
Living people
Finnish male judoka
Olympic judoka of Finland
Judoka at the 1984 Summer Olympics
Judoka at the 1988 Summer Olympics
Judoka at the 1992 Summer Olympics
People from Loimaa
Sportspeople from Southwest Finland